Walnut Grove is a ghost town in Mitchell County, Kansas, United States.

History
There were two settlements in Mitchell County with the name Walnut Grove. The first was in Hayes Township with a post office from 1876 to 1881. In 1886, Walnut Grove in Bloomfield Township was issued a post office. This post office was renamed Walnutgrove in 1894, then discontinued in 1901.

References

Former populated places in Mitchell County, Kansas
Former populated places in Kansas